Escape the Field is a 2022 American thriller film directed by Emerson Moore and starring Jordan Claire Robbins, Theo Rossi, and Shane West.

Plot
Six strangers who have been kidnapped wake up in a cornfield. They realize they have been abducted, but don't know by whom.  They understand that they have to survive in this environment that turns out to be hostile, solving puzzles with their respective abilities and some objects that have been given to them (matches, a compass, a canteen, a single bullet gun, a lantern, and a knife).

Cast
 Jordan Claire Robbins as Sam
 Theo Rossi as Tyler
 Shane West as Ryan
 Elena Juatco as Denise
 Julian Feder as Ethan 
 Tahirah Sharif as Cameron
 Emerson Moore as Business Man
 Jeff Kress as Creature

Production
Crystal Reed was initially cast in the role played by Robbins.

Principal photography occurred in Toronto in September 2020.

Release
In February 2022, it was announced that Lionsgate acquired North American and UK distribution rights to the film, which was released in May 2022.

Reception
The film has a 19% score on Rotten Tomatoes based on 27 reviews, with an average rating of 3.80/10.  Nick Allen of RogerEbert.com awarded the film one star out of four.

References

External links
 

American thriller films
Films shot in Toronto
2022 thriller films
2020s English-language films
2020s American films